YY Mensae, also known as HD 32918, is a variable star located in the southern circumpolar constellation Mensa. It has an apparent magnitude that fluctuates between 8.6 and 8.9, which is within the visibility of binoculars. Based on parallax measurements from Gaia DR3, it is estimated to be 715 light years distant.

This star was known to have an unusual spectrum since the 1970's, but its variability wasn't observed until the 1980's. Collier  (1982) found it to be a FK Comae Berenices variable, a class of rapidly rotating giant stars.  After a few additional years of observations, HD 32918 was given the variable star designation YY Mensae. A paper in 1987 observed a long and powerful flare coming from the star.  X-ray emissions from YY Mensa have been detected  in its corona, which may be a result of its fast rotation.

YY Mensae has a stellar classification of K1 III/IVe, indicating an evolved red giant with the blended luminosity class of a giant star and a subgiant. It is chromospherically active and emission lines are also present in its spectra. It has 98% the mass of the Sun but has expanded to 12.3 times its girth. The star is metal deficient, having an iron abundance only 26% that of the Sun.

References

Further reading

K-type giants
K-type subgiants
FK Comae Berenices variables
Mensae, YY
Emission-line stars
Mensa (constellation)
032918
023106
CD-75 00189